Skadden, Arps, Slate, Meagher & Flom LLP and Affiliates is an American multinational law firm headquartered in New York City. Founded in 1948, the firm consistently ranks among the top U.S. law firms by revenue. The company is known for its work on company mergers and takeovers.

History

The firm was founded in 1948 in New York by Marshall Skadden, John Slate and Les Arps. In 1959 William Meagher joined the firm and Elizabeth Head, the firm's first female attorney, was hired. In 1960 the firm's name became Skadden, Arps, Slate, Meagher & Flom. In 1961 Peter Mullen, who later served as Skadden's first executive partner, joined the firm.

In 1973 the firm opened its second office, in Boston. In 1981 Peggy L. Kerr became Skadden's first female partner. In 1985 Skadden was ranked as one of the three largest law firms in the United States.

In 1987 the firm opened its first international office, in Tokyo. In 1988 the Skadden Fellowship Foundation was created. Skadden's New York City headquarters moved to 4 Times Square, the "Condé Nast Building." in 2000. Together with the City College of New York, Skadden launched the Skadden, Arps Honors Program in 2008, with the goal of increasing diversity in law schools and the legal profession. , Skadden has 21 offices worldwide.

Key people
In February 2011, there were 432 Skadden partners worldwide. As of December 2016, there were 381 partners worldwide. Unlike some firms that have introduced two-tier partnerships with equity and non-equity partners, Skadden maintains a one-tier partnership, in which all partners are equity partners and share ownership of the firm. In January 2020, there were 349 partners worldwide. Notable partners include:

Stephen C. Robinson, former federal district court judge sitting in the U.S. District Court for the SDNY; former U.S. attorney for the District of Connecticut
Patrick B. Fitzgerald, former U.S. attorney for the Northern District of Illinois; as special counsel for the Department of Justice, the federal prosecutor in charge of the investigation of the Valerie Plame Affair
Fred T. Goldberg, Jr., commissioner of Internal Revenue (1989–92), assistant secretary for tax policy in the Department of the Treasury in 1992
Mark N. Kaplan, former CEO of Drexel Burnham Lambert and Engelhard
Michael Leiter, former director of the National Counterterrorism Center

Rankings

In 2015 and 2016, Skadden was the fourth largest law firm in the U.S. by revenue. In the 2015 Global 100 survey by The American Lawyer, Skadden ranked as the fourth-highest grossing law firm in the world. In 2016, Skadden had approximately 1,700 attorneys in 22 offices; in 2011, the firm had approximately 1,900 attorneys in 23 offices.  Measured by the number of attorneys, Skadden is the fifth largest law firm in New York and 12th largest in the United States. In 2016, Skadden was 187th on Forbes list of America's Largest Private Companies by revenue. Previously, the firm ranked 335th in 1995, 194th in 2003 and 213th in 2010. In 2015, Skadden became the first law firm ever to handle more than $1 trillion in M&A deals in a single year and, for the third time in six years, the Financial Times "Innovative Lawyers" report named Skadden the most innovative law firm in North America.

Other work

Russia and Ukraine 
Skadden has a history of representing clients with ties to the Vladimir Putin regime in Russia, such as Alfa Bank, Roman Abramovich, and Viktor F. Yanukovych's pro-Russian regime in Ukraine. In 2020, the firm paid a $4.6 million settlement for misleading U.S. authorities regarding its lobbying on behalf of a Russia-aligned Ukrainian government.

In 2012, Skadden took as a client Viktor F. Yanukovych, who was a pro-Russian president of Ukraine from 2010 to 2014. Paul Manafort helped arrange for the hiring of Skadden. One of company's actions on Yanukovych's behalf was to produce a report justifying Yanukovych's imprisonment of former prime minister Yulia V. Tymoshenko (who was pro-European) and denying that the action had been a political prosecution, although many Western countries characterized it as such. Later that year a team of American lawyers commissioned by the government of Ukraine concluded that Tymoshenko's trial had not been fair and her rights had been violated. After Yanukovych lost power in Euromaidan and fled to Russia, Skadden's work on his behalf led to several federal investigations. One Skadden attorney, Alex van der Zwaan, was convicted of lying to the FBI about his work on Yanukovych's behalf and served 30 days in jail. In 2019, Skadden lawyer Gregory B. Craig was indicted on charges of lying to federal prosecutors about the work he did at Skadden on behalf of the Yanukovych, but was acquitted in a jury trial. 

Tymoshenko made plans to sue Skadden, and in May 2020 it was revealed that Skadden had paid at least $11 million to settle the case before a lawsuit could be filed.

Skadden, along with Mercury Public Affairs and the Podesta Group, was investigated by the U.S. attorney's office for the Southern District of New York (SDNY) for possible lobbying violations regarding former Trump campaign chairman Paul Manafort. In 2019, Skadden agreed to pay a $4.6 million settlement to the Department of Justice over the firm's failure to register as a foreign agent under the Foreign Agent Registrations Act.

Skadden has been involved in representing Russian groups in corporate deals worth around $90 billion. Skadden has represented Alfa Bank, a Russian bank closely associated with Russian oligarchs and the Vladimir Putin regime. After Russia invaded Ukraine in 2022 and amid heavy sanctions against Alfa Bank, Skadden said it was "in the process of ending our representations of Alfa Bank." Skadden has a long-standing relationship with Russian oligarch Roman Abramovich – Skadden refused to say whether it still represented him in 2022.

Political contributions
Skadden partners and employees tend to support and contribute more to Democratic political candidates than to Republicans. Prominent lawyers at the firm endorsed and financially supported John Kerry in his campaign to become president of the United States in 2004. In the run-up to Super Tuesday 2008, Skadden hosted a phone bank in support of Barack Obama's 2008 presidential campaign.

According to OpenSecrets, Skadden was one of the top law firms contributing to federal candidates during the 2012 election cycle, donating $1.98 million, 76% to Democrats. From 1990 through 2008, Skadden contributed $11.93 million to federal campaigns; between 2000 and 2008 the firm spent $2.2 million on lobbying.

Notable alumni
In addition to numerous professors and partners at other firms, some of the more notable former Skadden attorneys include:

 Amelia Boone, obstacle racer, 2012 Spartan Race World Champion and three-time Tough Mudder champion
 Bruce M. Buck, chairman of Chelsea Football Club
 Gregory B. Craig, former White House counsel to President Barack Obama
 George B. Daniels, judge, U.S. District Court for the Southern District of New York (2000–)
 Robert Del Tufo, former New Jersey attorney general and U.S. attorney for the District of New Jersey
 John Feerick, former dean of Fordham University School of Law
 Joseph Flom, name-partner
 Chip Flowers, first African-American elected official in Delaware (state treasurer) and co-chair, National Democratic State Treasurers (2010-2014)
 Greg Giraldo, lawyer turned comedian and roast master
 Keith Gottfried, general counsel for the U.S. Department of Housing and Urban Development (2005–09)
 Laura Ingraham, Fox News anchor and host of The Ingraham Angle
 Merit Janow, American academic, former dean of School of International and Public Affairs, Columbia University
 Helene L. Kaplan, former Chairman of the Carnegie Corporation of New York
Mark N. Kaplan, former CEO of Drexel Burnham Lambert from 1970 to 1977 and CEO of Engelhard
 Judge Judith S. Kaye, longest-tenured chief judge of the New York Court of Appeals, serving 1993-2008
 Robert Lighthizer, former United States trade representative (2017–21)
 Finbarr O'Neill, former CEO of J.D. Power, Hyundai Motor America and Mitsubishi Motors North America
 Robert S. Pirie, co-chairman and CEO of Rothschild, North America, senior managing director of Bear Stearns & Co., and vice-chairman of Investment Banking at SG Cowen Securities Corporation
 Douglas Rediker, executive chairman of International Capital Strategies; former U.S. alternate executive director, International Monetary Fund (2010–2012)
 Irving S. Shapiro, former CEO, DuPont
 Isaac Shapiro, former president, Japan Society
John Slate, name partner
 Mary L. Smith, principal deputy director and acting agency head of Indian Health Service; former official, United States Department of Justice Civil Division; former nominee, assistant attorney general, United States Department of Justice, Tax Division
 Leo Strine, chief justice of the Delaware Supreme Court (2014–2019); previously chancellor (2011–2014) and vice-chancellor (1998–2011) of the Delaware Court of Chancery
 Robert W. Sweet, judge, U.S. District Court for the Southern District of New York (1978–1991, senior status 1991–2019)
 William H. Timbers, former judge, U.S. Court of Appeals for the Second Circuit (1971–1981, senior status 1981–1994); chief judge (1964–1971), judge (1960–1971), U.S. District Court for the District of Connecticut
 Alex van der Zwaan, attorney, charged with lying to federal investigators about his interactions with Rick Gates in an investigation in Russian interference in the 2016 United States elections.
 Stephen Vaughn, former acting United States trade representative (USTR) and USTR general counsel
 Harold M. Williams, former chair, Securities and Exchange Commission (1977–1981)

See also
Russian interference in the 2016 United States elections

References

Further reading

"How Skadden Does It", Andrew Longstreth, The American Lawyer, May 2006.

External links

Skadden Fellowship Foundation

Law firms established in 1948
Law firms based in New York City
Privately held companies of the United States
Foreign law firms with offices in Hong Kong
Foreign law firms with offices in Japan
1948 establishments in New York City
American companies established in 1948